Flanders is an unincorporated community and census-designated place (CDP) located within Mount Olive Township, in southwestern Morris County, in the U.S. state of New Jersey. Flanders is served by the United States Postal Service as ZIP Code 07836.

Demographics
 

 
As of the 2020 United States census, the Flanders CDP's population was 9,832, a decrease of 2,736 (−21.8%) from the 12,568 enumerated at the 2010 census in the Flanders ZIP Code Tabulation Area, which in turn reflected an increase of 351 (+2.9%) from the 12,217 counted at the 2000 census.

Notable people

People who were born in, residents of, or otherwise closely associated with Flanders include:
 Kenny Agostino (born 1992), professional hockey player who played for the Montreal Canadiens.
 Noah Brown (born 1996), wide receiver for the Dallas Cowboys.
 David W. K. Peacock Jr. (1924–2005), government official and businessman who served as a Deputy Undersecretary at the Department of Commerce during the Nixon Administration.
 John R. Neill (1877-1943), magazine and children's book illustrator primarily known for illustrating more than forty stories set in the Land of Oz.
 Jonathan Nicholas (1757/59–1839), early settler of Flanders who served as a sergeant in the American Revolutionary War.
 Lee Rouson (born 1962), former NFL running back for the New York Giants.
 Steve Slattery (born 1980), Olympic track and field athlete.
 Charles Stewart Wurts (1790-1859), founder of the Delaware and Hudson Canal Company.
 John Wurts (1792-1861), member of the United States House of Representatives from Pennsylvania.

References

Mount Olive Township, New Jersey
Census-designated places in Morris County, New Jersey
Census-designated places in New Jersey
Unincorporated communities in Morris County, New Jersey
Unincorporated communities in New Jersey